Canadian Forces Base Goose Bay , commonly referred to as CFB Goose Bay, is a Canadian Forces Base located in the municipality of Happy Valley-Goose Bay in the province of Newfoundland and Labrador. It is operated as an air force base by the Royal Canadian Air Force (RCAF). Its primary RCAF lodger unit is 5 Wing, commonly referred to as 5 Wing Goose Bay.

The airfield at CFB Goose Bay is also used by civilian aircraft, with civilian operations at the base referring to the facility as Goose Bay Airport. The airport is classified as an airport of entry by Nav Canada and is staffed by the Canada Border Services Agency (CBSA). CBSA officers at this airport can handle general aviation aircraft only, with no more than 15 passengers.

The mission of 5 Wing is to support the defence of North American airspace, as well as to support the RCAF and allied air forces in training. Two units compose 5 Wing: 444 Combat Support Squadron (flying the CH-146 Griffon) and 5 Wing Air Reserve Flight. CFB Goose Bay also serves as a forward operating location for RCAF CF-18 Hornet aircraft and the base and surrounding area is occasionally used to support units of the Canadian Army during training exercises.

History
While the flat and relatively weather-favoured area around North West River had for years been under consideration for an airport for the anticipated North Atlantic air routes, it was not until Eric Fry of the Dominion Geodetic Survey investigated the area on 1July 1941 that the Goose Bay location was selected. Fry beat by three days a similar United States Army Air Forces (USAAF) survey team under Captain Elliott Roosevelt; the American team had first investigated nearby Epinette Point before joining Fry at the sandy plains that would become Goose Bay. These surveys used amphibious aircraft that landed at the Grenfell Mission; from there the teams explored by boat.

Eric Fry recalled: "The airport is actually located on the plateau at the west end of Terrington Basin but it is only five miles inland from the narrows between Goose Bay and Terrington Basin. Having a Gander air base in Newfoundland I suggested we call the Labrador site Goose Bay airport and the suggestion was accepted."

Under pressure from Britain and the United States the Canadian Air Ministry worked at a record pace, and by November, three 
 gravel runways were ready. The first land aircraft movement was recorded on 9 December 1941. By spring of 1942 the base, now carrying the wartime codename Alkali, was bursting with air traffic destined for the United Kingdom. In time, the USAAF and the British Royal Air Force (RAF) each developed sections of the triangular base for their own use, but the airport remained under overall Canadian control despite its location in the Dominion of Newfoundland, not yet a part of Canada. The 99-year lease arrangement with the United Kingdom was not finalized until October 1944.

Aerodrome
The field was listed as "all hard-surfaced" and had three runways listed as follows:

The northeast side of the facility was built to be a temporary RCAF base, complete with its own hangars and control tower, while the south side of the facility, built for the Americans, was being upgraded with its own aprons, hangars, earth-covered magazines, control tower and infrastructure.  The Canadian and American bases were built as an RCAF station and later a United States Air Force base known as Goose AB, housing units of the Strategic Air Command and Aerospace Defense Command. It was later home to permanent detachments of the RAF, Luftwaffe, Aeronautica Militare, and Royal Netherlands Air Force, in addition to temporary deployments from several other NATO countries.

Cold War history 
1950 – The Rivière-du-Loup Incident

Goose Air Base was the site of the first US nuclear weapons in Canada, when in 1950 the United States Air Force Strategic Air Command (SAC) stationed 11 model 1561 Fat Man and Mark 4 atomic bombs at the base in the summer, and flew them out in December. While returning to Davis–Monthan Air Force Base with one of the bombs on board, a USAF B-50 heavy bomber encountered engine trouble, had to drop, and conventionally detonate, the bomb over the St. Lawrence, contaminating the river with uranium-238.

1954 – Construction of the Strategic Air Command Weapons Storage Area
Construction of SAC's Weapons Storage Area at Goose Air Base was officially completed in 1954. The area was surrounded by two fences, topped with barbed wire.  It was the highest security area in Goose Air Base and comprised
 One guard house
 One administration building
 Three warehouses (base spares #1, base spares #2, supply warehouse)
 Six guard towers
 One plant group building
 Five earth-covered magazines for non-nuclear weapon storage
 Four earth-covered magazines for "pit" storage (constructed with vaults and shelving to store pit "birdcages")
The design and layout of the Goose Air Base weapons storage area was identical, with only slight modifications for weather and terrain, to the three SAC weapons storage areas in Morocco located at Sidi Slimane Air Base, Ben Guerir Air Base, and Nouasseur Air Base, which were constructed between 1951 and 1952 as overseas operational storage sites.
The last nuclear bomb components that were being stored at the Goose Air Base weapons storage area were removed in June 1971.

1958 – Construction of the Air Defence Command ammunition storage area
Construction of the Air Defence Command ammunition storage area at Goose Air Base was completed in 1958. This extension to the SAC weapons storage area was built directly beside the previously constructed area, with a separate entrance. The buildings built within the area were:
 Three storage buildings
 One guardhouse
 One missile assembly building.
The storage was being built to accommodate components of the GAR-11/AIM-26 "Nuclear" Falcon, which is normally stored in pieces, requiring assembly before use.

1976 – Departure of the USAF Strategic Air Command and closure of Goose AB
The former U.S. facilities were redesignated CFB Goose Bay (the second time this facility name has been used). The value of the airfield and facilities built and improved by the USAF since 1953 and transferred to Canada were estimated in excess of US$250 million (equivalent to $ billion today). By 1976 all SAC assets had been stood down, and only USAF logistical and transport support remained.

1980 – Multinational low-level flying training stepped up
In response to lessons learned from the Vietnam War and the growing sophistication of Soviet anti-aircraft radar and surface-to-air missile technology being deployed in Europe, NATO allies began looking at new doctrines in the 1970s–1980s which mandated low-level flight to evade detection. Labrador's sparse settlement and a local topography similar to parts of the Soviet Union, in addition to proximity to European NATO nations caused CFB Goose Bay to grow and become the primary low-level tactical training area for several NATO air forces during the 1980s.

The increased low-level flights by fighter aircraft was not without serious controversy as the Innu Nation protested these operations vociferously, claiming that the noise of aircraft travelling at supersonic speeds in close proximity to the ground (nap-of-the-earth flying) was adversely affecting wildlife, namely caribou, and was a nuisance to their way of life on their traditional lands.

During the 1980s–1990s, CFB Goose Bay hosted permanent detachments from the Royal Air Force, Luftwaffe, Royal Netherlands Air Force (RNLAF), and the Aeronautica Militare, in addition to temporary deployments from several other NATO countries. The permanent RNLAF detachment left CFB Goose Bay in the 1990s, although temporary training postings have been held since. Goose Bay was an attractive training facility for these air forces in light of the high population concentration in their countries, as well as numerous laws preventing low-level flying. The  bombing range is larger than several European countries.

1983 – The Space Shuttle Enterprise visits
In 1983, a NASA Boeing 747 transport aircraft carrying the Space Shuttle Enterprise landed at CFB Goose Bay to refuel on its way to a European tour where the prototype shuttle was then displayed in France and the United Kingdom. This was the first time that a U.S. Space Shuttle ever "landed" outside the United States.

1988 – Long-range radar closure
In 1988, the Pinetree Line radar site (Melville Air Station) adjacent to CFB Goose Bay was closed.

Post-Cold War history
1990 – Gulf War
Goose Bay experienced a significant increase in traffic volume from USAF Military Airlift Command (MAC) during August 1990 due to Operation Desert Storm. At one point, MAC flights arrived at an average rate of two per hour; the normal rate was two to three per month. Part of the increase may have been driven by Hurricane Bertha, which occurred at the same time. The USAF deployed additional personnel to the base to assist managing the increased volume. Overall, operations proceeded smoothly as it resembled previous high-volume airlifts like Exercise Reforger.

1993 – Base Rescue Flight and 444 Combat Support Squadron
To provide rescue and range support to the jet aircraft operating from Goose Bay, the Canadian Forces provided a Base Rescue Flight consisting of three CH-135 Twin Huey helicopters. In 1993 the Base Rescue Flight was re-badged as 444 Combat Support Squadron and continued to operate the same fleet of three helicopters. In 1996 the CH-135s were replaced with three CH-146 Griffon helicopters.

2001 – 9/11 Operation Yellow Ribbon
On 11 September 2001, CFB Goose Bay hosted seven trans-Atlantic commercial airliners which were diverted to land as part of Operation Yellow Ribbon, following the closure of North American airspace as a result of the 9/11 terrorist attacks on the World Trade Center in New York City and the Pentagon in Washington D.C. It was also the first Canadian airport to receive diverted aircraft.

2005 – Cessation of Multinational Low Level Flying Training
In 2004 the RAF announced its intent to close the permanent RAF detachment, effective 31 March 2005. The German and Italian air forces had agreements signed to use the base until 2006, however they were not renewed as of 2004. These air forces still operate at Goose Bay, but plan to initiate simulator training instead. The base continues in its role as a low-level tactical training facility and as a forward deployment location for Canadian Forces Air Command, although the total complement of Canadian Forces personnel numbers less than 100.

2005 – Ballistic Missile Defence
Labradorian politicians such as former Liberal Senator Bill Rompkey have advocated using CFB Goose Bay as a site for a missile defence radar system being developed by the United States Department of Defense. Executives from defence contractor Raytheon have surveyed CFB Goose Bay as a suitable location for deploying such a radar installation.

Airlines and destinations
Civilian flights use a smaller terminal structure located on Zweibrucken Crescent. A new terminal structure was being built in 2012 to accommodate civilian use. The terminal has a single retail tenant, Flightline Café and Gifts with a Robin's Donuts shop.

An increasing number of airliners (especially mid-range aircraft like the Boeing 757) have resorted to using Goose Bay for unplanned fuel stops, especially common for trans-Atlantic flights impacted by a seasonally strong jet stream over the North Atlantic. The majority of civilian airliners using the airfield are not regularly scheduled airlines to this location.

Helicopter charters are operated by CHC Helicopter, Cougar Helicopters and Universal Helicopters.

Air Labrador was a tenant of the airport until the airline ceased operations in 2017 when it was merged with Innu Mikun Airlines as Air Borealis. It flew mainly from Goose Bay to remote communities in Newfoundland and Labrador and Quebec.

Historical airline service

In 1950, Trans-Canada Air Lines (TCA) was operating round trip transatlantic service via a stop at the airport with a routing of Montreal Dorval Airport - Goose Bay - Glasgow Prestwick Airport - London Airport (now Heathrow Airport) flown with Canadair North Star aircraft which was a Canadian manufactured version of the Douglas DC-4.  By 1962, Trans-Canada was serving Goose Bay with nonstop flights twice a week from Montreal Dorval Airport operated with Vickers Vanguard turboprop aircraft. In 1981, Eastern Provincial Airways was the only airline serving Goose Bay with nonstop Boeing 737-200 jet service from Churchill Falls, Deer Lake, Halifax, Montreal Dorval Airport, St. John's, Stephenville and Wabush although none of these flights were operated on a daily basis. By 1989, Canadian Airlines International was operating nonstop Boeing 737-200 jet service to Montreal Dorval Airport four days a week. On January 23, 2021 Air Canada Express ended service from the airport to Halifax Airport because of reduced demand due to the COVID-19 pandemic. Service returned on April 30, 2022.

Units, squadrons and formations 
The principal components of CFB Goose Bay are:
444 Combat Support Squadron
5 Wing Air Reserve Flight
Forward Operating Location Goose Bay

Fixed-base operators 
The following fixed-base operators (FBOs) are based at CFB Goose Bay:
PAL Airlines
Canadian Helicopters
Universal Helicopters

Accidents and incidents
On 23 December 1945, a Douglas C-47B Dakota IV of the Royal Canadian Air Force (RCAF) crashed upon landing in a snowstorm. 
On 10 December 1947, a Douglas C-54D-5-DC of the United States Air Force (USAF) crashed and burned in a wooded area shortly after taking off from Goose Bay resulting in 23 fatalities.
The Boeing B-50 Superfortress of the Rivière-du-Loup nuclear weapon incident on 10 November 1950 departed Goose AFB to return a US Mark 4 nuclear bomb to Davis–Monthan Air Force Base. 
On 16 January 1951, a USAF Douglas C-47B-1-DL crashed upon takeoff.
On 14 May 1951, a RCAF Douglas C-47A-10-DK disintegrated in-flight and crashed killing four crew members. 
On 21 July 1952, a RCAF Douglas C-47A-30-DL crashed while engaged on insect spraying operations near Goose Bay. The crew of three were killed.
On 10 April 1956, a RCAF de Havilland Canada U-1A Otter crashed after takeoff on runway 09 killing three.
On 6 July 1956, a USAF Boeing KC-97 Stratofreighter caught fire while descending to Goose AFB on a flight from Lake Charles, Louisiana. The airplane crashed 72 km northeast of Goose Bay killing all six crew members.
On 1 October 1957, a Consolidated PBY-5A Catalina of Eastern Provincial Airways lost power and crashed upon returning to Goose Bay from supplying diesel fuel to the Bell Canada Tropospheric scatter site at Sona Lake. 
On 7 November 1964, a USAF Douglas C-133A Cargomaster stalled at full power after takeoff and crashed killing seven crew members.
On 1 October 1967, a Dassault Falcon 20C of Trans Commerce Leasing ran out of fuel and crashed on approach to Goose Bay.
On 18 July 1981, a McDonnell Douglas F-4F Phantom II of the Luftwaffe was returning to Goose Bay after a low-level training mission when it crashed into Lake Melville. 
On 11 October 1984, a de Havilland Canada DHC-6 Twin Otter 100 of Labrador Airways flying on a medevac flight from St. Anthony crashed upon landing at Goose Bay killing four.
On 14 May 1985, Northrop test pilot David Barnes was killed when his prototype Northrop F-20 Tigershark (82-0063, c/n GI.1001, N3986B) crashed during a test flight. 
On 10 January 1986, a de Havilland Canada DHC-2 Beaver (C-GUBD) of Goose Bay Air Services departed Goose Bay and crashed at Border Beacon due to unknown circumstances.
On 24 March 1986, a de Havilland Canada DHC-3 Otter (C-FAGM) of Goose Bay Air Services was flying to Goose Bay on the return leg of a charter flight to Snegamook Lake when a fatigue-initiated crack in the cylinder head caused the engine to lose power. The aircraft crashed and caught fire killing four of the five occupants.
On 10 May 1990, a General Dynamics F-16A Fighting Falcon (J-358) of the Royal Netherlands Air Force (RNLAF) collided in mid-air with another RNLAF F-16A (78-0258, J-258) 13 km west of Grand Lake killing its pilot. The pilot of the J-258 ejected safely. 
On 8 February 1991, a Cessna 208B Grand Caravan of Provincial Airlines impacted the ground on approach to Goose Bay killing the pilot. 
On 22 April 1993, a McDonnell Douglas F-4F Phantom II of the Luftwaffe hit the ground while flying a roll at 150 metres during an airshow practice routine killing both crew. 
On 24 August 1996, two Panavia Tornados of the Luftwaffe crashed during low-level training exercises 125 km west of Goose Bay killing one pilot. 
On 11 September 1997, an F-16 (J-228) of 312 squadron RNLAF collided with trees after failing to clear a ridge during a low-level training flight in the Churchill River valley, 55nm southwest of Goose Bay. The aircraft returned to Goose Bay safely.
On 30 August 2000, a Panavia Tornado of the Luftwaffe crashed during low-level flight practice 190 km southeast of CFB Goose Bay killing both crew members. 
On 4 March 2002, a Swearingen SA227-AC Metro III of Provincial Airlines crashed upon landing at Goose Bay. 
On 18 July 2002, a RCAF CH-146 Griffon was returning to 5 Wing from an aborted search and rescue mission, when the tail rotor became separated from the aircraft. The aircraft crashed 68 km northeast of Goose Bay; both crew members were killed.
On 6 November 2006, a de Havilland Canada DHC-6 Twin Otter 300 of Provincial Airlines had a right main gear collapse when the aircraft landed at Goose Bay. 
 On 30 September 2017, Air France Flight 66, an Airbus A380-800 (registration F-HPJE) from Paris to Los Angeles suffered an in-flight failure of the #4 engine  when the main fan and engine inlet separated from the main engine assembly. The plane was diverted to CFB Goose Bay, where it made an emergency landing. The plane landed safely and no passengers or crew were harmed. Passengers reported a loud thud followed by vibrations. The runway the plane landed on had to be cleaned after landing because debris from the engine had littered the runway. Passengers had to stay onboard because Goose Bay did not have air stairs large enough to accommodate the large aircraft. Air France dispatched two Boeing 777-300 from Montreal, continuing to take the passengers to Los Angeles.
 On 14 December 2022, a Piper PA-46 from Sept-Îles to Nuuk crashed 5km west of the airport on approach to runway 08. The two occupants sustained serious injuries and were transported to the local hospital. The pilot later died of his injuries.

Historic place 
Hangar 8 at CFB Goose Bay was designated as a Canadian historic place in 2004.

See also

Goose (Otter Creek) Water Aerodrome
List of United States Air Force Aerospace Defense Command Interceptor Squadrons

Notes

References

 A Handbook of Aerospace Defense Organization 1946 – 1980, by Lloyd H. Cornett and Mildred W. Johnson, Office of History, Aerospace Defense Center, Peterson Air Force Base, Colorado
 Winkler, David F. (1997), Searching the skies: the legacy of the United States Cold War defense radar program. Prepared for United States Air Force Headquarters Air Combat Command.
 Information for Melville AS, Goose Bay, NL
 Carr, William G.: Checkmate in the North. MacMillan, Toronto, 1944.
 Christie, Carl A.: Ocean Bridge. University of Toronto Press, 1995.
 Hansen, Chris: Enfant Terrible: The Times and Schemes of General Elliott Roosevelt. Able Baker, Tucson, 2012.
 Carr, William G.: Checkmate in the North, 1944

External links

CFB Goose Bay (5 Wing Goose Bay) – official site
The MFRC Flyer (CFB Goose Bay newspaper)
Canada's Historic Places – Royal Canadian Air Force Hangar 8 CFB Goose Bay

Goose Bay
Goose
Goose
Goose Bay Airport
Goose Bay
Destroyers for Bases Agreement airfields
Goose
Installations of Strategic Air Command
WAAS reference stations
Military airbases in Newfoundland and Labrador
Radar stations of the United States Air Force
Aerospace Defense Command military installations
Goose
1941 establishments in Newfoundland
Military installations of the United Kingdom in other countries
Foreign military bases in Canada